Leucopogon distans is a flowering plant in the family Ericaceae and is endemic to the south-west of Western Australia. The flowers are arranged in spikes on the ends of branches or in upper leaf axils, the flowers well-spaced from each other, with small bracts and broad bracteoles at the base. Flowering occurs from July to February.  

Leucopogon distans was first formally described in 1810 by Robert Brown in his Prodromus Florae Novae Hollandiae. The specific epithet (distans) means "distant", referring to the well-spaced flowers. 

This leucopogon grows on sandy and gravelly soils in swamps, sandplains and hills in the Esperance Plains, Jarrah Forest and Warren bioregions of south-western Western Australia.

References 

distans
Ericales of Australia
Flora of Western Australia
Plants described in 1810
Taxa named by Robert Brown (botanist, born 1773)